Jenny Karolius  (born 24 May 1986) is a retired German handball player who most recently played for Bayer Leverkusen and the German national team.

She was part of the team at the 2016 European Women's Handball Championship.

References

1986 births
Living people
German female handball players
Handball players from Berlin
20th-century German women
21st-century German women